Conlee (a variant of Conley) is a surname of Irish origin. It has many variations in spelling.

It may refer to:

Jenny Conlee (b. 1971), accordionist/pianist for the indie rock band The Decemberists.
John Conlee (b. 1946), country music singer.

See also
Connolly (surname)
Connelly (surname)

References

English-language surnames
Surnames of Irish origin